Thunder Over the Prairie is a 1941 American Western film directed by Lambert Hillyer and written by Betty Burbridge. It is based on the 1935 novel The Medico Rides by James L. Rubel. The film stars Charles Starrett, Cliff Edwards, Eileen O'Hearn, Stanley Brown, Danny Mummert and David Sharpe. The film was released on July 30, 1941, by Columbia Pictures.

Plot

Cast          
Charles Starrett as Dr. Steven Monroe 
Cliff Edwards as 'Bones' Malloy
Eileen O'Hearn as Nora Mandan
Stanley Brown as Roy Mandan
Danny Mummert as Timmy Wheeler
David Sharpe as Clay Mandan
Ray Bennett as 'Ace' Hartley
Joe McGuinn as Hartley
Donald Curtis as Taylor
Ted Adams as Dave Wheeler
Jack Rockwell as Henry Clayton
Budd Buster as Judge Merriwether
Horace B. Carpenter as Bailiff 
Cal Shrum as Band Leader

References

External links
 

1941 films
American Western (genre) films
1941 Western (genre) films
Columbia Pictures films
Films directed by Lambert Hillyer
American black-and-white films
1940s English-language films
1940s American films